{{Automatic taxobox
| image = Proschaliphora butti.JPG
| image_caption = Proschaliphora butti| taxon = Proschaliphora
| authority = Hampson, 1901
}}Proschaliphora' is a genus of moths in the family Noctuidae.

Species
 Proschaliphora albida Hampson, 1909
 Proschaliphora aurata Kühne, 2010
 Proschaliphora butti Rothschild, 1910
 Proschaliphora citricostata Hampson, 1901
 Proschaliphora lineata Kühne, 2010
 Proschaliphora minima'' Kühne, 2010

References

Arctiinae